Northside High School, formerly Jefferson Davis High School, is a secondary school located at 1101 Quitman in the Near Northside neighborhood of Northside, Houston, Texas with a ZIP code of 77009. The school was previously named after Jefferson Davis, the only president of the Confederate States of America.

The school, which serves grades 9 through 12, is a part of the Houston Independent School District. The mascot of Northside is the Panther.

The school also has a Hotel and Restaurant Management magnet program.

The HISD board voted to give the school its current name in 2016.

History
Davis was previously reserved for white children but it desegregated by 1970.

In 1993, project GRAD (Graduation Really Achieves Dreams) was founded at Davis High. The program provides scholarships to students as incentive to complete high school and enroll in college.

Prior to 1996 it was renovated through the Renewal A bond program, which spent $5.5 million on Davis. In 1996 it had 1,800 students.

Campus
In 1996 the school had terrazzo floors. At the time it had one temporary building used for classes and two others for other purposes; it had a fewer amount compared to some other schools because it was not overcrowded. In 1996 Terry Kliewer of the Houston Chronicle praised the building's features and maintenance, and stated that it "exemplifies what is possible when an old building gets good maintenance and timely remodeling."

Neighborhoods served by Northside
Northside High School serves Near Northside, Northside Village, Irvington, Lindale Park, a portion of the Fifth Ward, and most of Downtown Houston.

The school serves Irvington Village, a public housing unit and Fulton Village, a mixed-income unit, both of the Houston Housing Authority. The school's boundary also includes the
Four Seasons Hotel Houston residences, Houston House Apartments, One Park Place, and The Rice.

Student body
During the 2006-2007 school year, 1,577 students were enrolled at Davis.

About 85% of the students were Hispanic American, and 12% of the students were African American. Also, 2% of the students were White American. Less than one percent of the students were Asian American. Less than one percent of the students was Native American. About 80% of the students qualify for free or reduced lunch.

Extracurricular activities

In the summer of 2016, the former JDMB (Jeff Davis Marching Band), was reorganized into the Northside Marching Band.  The Panther Band is directed by Timothy D. Richardson, a graduate of Prairie View A&M University, who took over the band program in 2015.  The band specializes in show style marching, with certain elements implemented from corps style marching.

In 2015 the Mariachi Pantera had 28 students. It travels out of state. The Pantera had issues with lack of interest in 2014 but had recovered the following year.

Feeder patterns
Elementary schools feeding into Davis include:
 Ketelsen
 Looscan
 Clemente Martinez
 Sherman

Partial:
 Crockett
 Gregory-Lincoln Education Center
 Herrera
 Jefferson
 Ross
 Travis

All of Marshall Middle School's attendance zone is within the Davis High School attendance zone.

Middle schools that have portions of their attendance boundaries zoned to Davis include:
Burbank
Fleming
Gregory-Lincoln MS
Key

Notable alumni

 Frank Carswell - former Detroit Tigers outfielder and minor-league manager
 Carl Crawford - Major League Baseball outfielder 2002-16, 4-time All-Star
 James DeAnda - former federal judge of U.S. District Court for the Southern District of Texas
 Gene Green - Democratic Party member of U.S. House of Representatives
 Ricardo "Rocky" Juarez - 1999 World Champion boxer and Olympic silver medalist
 Slater N. Martin - NBA Basketball player and Hall of Famer, played for Minneapolis Lakers (now Los Angeles Lakers), New York Knicks, and St. Louis Hawks (now Atlanta Hawks).
 Kenny Rogers - country singer
 Jesse Valdez - participant in 1972 Olympic Games

See also

References

Further reading
 Campos, Wendy, Cecilia Cruz, Stephen Martin, and Xochitl Vandiver-Rodríguez. "Jefferson Davis High School: The Past and the Present." history paper (for History 3394). May 17, 1994. In the possession of Professor Guadalupe San Miguel of the University of Houston. San Miguel cited the paper in his book, Brown, Not White: School Integration and the Chicano Movement in Houston.

External links
 Northside High School
 

Houston Independent School District high schools
Magnet schools in Houston
Public high schools in Houston